Pantodontidae is a family of ray-finned fish in the order Osteoglossiformes. It contains the living freshwater butterflyfish (Pantodon buchholzi) of Africa, as well as five extinct species from the Late Cretaceous (Cenomanian) of Lebanon.

Taxonomy 
 Capassopiscis 
 Capassopiscis pankowskii 
 Palaeopantodon 
 Palaeopantodon vandersypeni 
 Pankowskipiscis 
 Pankowskipiscis haqelensis 
 Pantodon 
 Pantodon buchholzi  (freshwater butterflyfish)
 Petersichthys 
 Petersichthys libanicus 
 Prognathoglossum 
 Prognathoglossum kalassyi

References 

Osteoglossiformes
Ray-finned fish families
Extant Cenomanian first appearances
Taxa named by Wilhelm Peters